Information Systems & Services (ISS) was a cluster within Strategic Command Top Level Budget of the United Kingdom Ministry of Defence. ISS was replaced by Defence Digital in 2019.

History 
ISS was created from the former Defence Communication Services Agency (DCSA) on 1 April 2007.

The organisation was spread across a number of sites, but in 2010 a £690 million programme was announced to unite ISS at MoD Corsham, Witshire in a modern office complex with 1,874 workspaces.

In 2019 ISS and a number of organisations were brought together as Defence Digital, with an annual budget of over £2 billion and about 2,400 staff including military, civil servants and contractors, led by Ministry of Defence chief information officer Charles Forte.

Role
Information Systems & Services provided the procurement and support functions for integrated information and communication services across the Armed Forces, the Ministry of Defence and to overseas bases, operations and ships.

References

Defence agencies of the United Kingdom
Information technology organisations based in the United Kingdom
Organisations based in Wiltshire
Organizations established in 2007
Science and technology in Wiltshire